The Carolina Vipers were an indoor soccer team based in Charlotte, North Carolina that played in the Continental Indoor Soccer League. They played only one season in 1994. Their home arena was Independence Arena.

The Vipers were owned by former Charlotte Hornets investor Felix Sabates and former Hornets President Carl Scheer, who also owned the Charlotte Checkers (1993–2010) minor league hockey team during this era.

The roster included: Tom Misuraca, Jimmy McGeough, Troy "Chopper" Edwards, Mark Lugris, Willie Files, Brad Davis, Chris Dunlap, Kurt Lehnert, John Ngando, Jesse Roberts, Brad Agoos, John Garvey, Bob DiNunzio, Kevin MacFarlane, Jimmy Fisher, Chip Sorrell and Yaro.  The head coach was David Irving, and the trainer was Dan DelVecchio.

Year-by-year

References

Sports teams in Charlotte, North Carolina
Defunct indoor soccer clubs in the United States
Defunct soccer clubs in North Carolina
Continental Indoor Soccer League teams
1994 establishments in North Carolina
1994 disestablishments in North Carolina
Association football clubs established in 1994
Association football clubs disestablished in 1994